The 2010 Oregon State Beavers football team represented Oregon State University during the 2010 NCAA Division I FBS football season. The team's head coach was Mike Riley, in his eighth straight season and tenth overall. Home games were played at Reser Stadium in Corvallis and they were members of the Pacific-10 Conference. The Beavers finished the season 5–7, 4–5 in Pac-10 play.

Before the season

Schedule

Roster

Game summaries

TCU

Louisville

Boise State

Arizona State

Arizona

Washington

Washington's Jake Locker threw a career-high five touchdown passes, two in overtime to Jermaine Kearse, and the Huskies stopped the Beavers 2-point conversion in double overtime to keep their bowl hopes alive.

Chris Polk ran for 105 yards on 25 carries for the Huskies.

Beavers running back Jacquizz Rodgers ran for 140 yards on 32 carries and three touchdowns. He also caught four passes for 49 yards and a 10-yard TD catch in the first overtime. The Beavers were playing their first game since Rodgers' brother, James, was lost for the season because of a serious knee injury.

The game came down to the Beavers final possession in the second overtime.  On 4th down from the UW 4-yard line, Beaver quarterback Ryan Katz's pass for John Reese fell to the turf in the end zone. The Huskies stormed the field, only then to realize a late flag from back judge Johnny Jenkins was for pass interference against the Huskies' Desmond Trufant.

Jacquizz Rodgers then scored from the 2 on the next play to pull Oregon State to 35–34. Beavers coach Mike Riley called timeout and decided to go for two. But Katz's throw fell out of Joe Halahuni's hands as he was hit by linebacker Cort Dennison and Washington's celebration was on again.

Washington snapped a six-game losing streak to the Beavers.

California

UCLA

The Bruins snapped a three-game losing streak with a 51-yard field goal by Kai Forbath with one second left in the game to give UCLA a 17–14 victory over the visiting Beavers. With 1:17 left in the game, Forbath missed a 46-yard field goal, which went wide left. Originally, the field officials had ruled that UCLA had no time left, but the challenge gave the Bruins one more second left to set up the field goal try.

Richard Brehaut scored for UCLA in the first quarter with a seven-yard run and Joe Halahuni did the same for Oregon State with a 28-yard pass from Ryan Katz.

In the third quarter, Markus Wheaton ran for 22-yard touchdown for the Beavers lead and Johnathan Franklin scored from the 1-yard line for a Bruins touchdown to tie the game.

Washington State 

The Cougars snapped a no-win Pac-10 season with a win over the Beavers in Corvallis, Oregon.

USC

After a field goal in the first quarter, Jordan Poyer took an interception into the end zone to give the Beavers a 10–0 lead in the second quarter. Jacquizz Rodgers scored from the 3-yard line and Justin Kahut kicked his second field goal in the half to give OSU a 20-point lead going into the locker room.

In the third quarter, Kahut hit a 35-yard field goal for Oregon State and C.J. Gable rushed for a 13-yard touchdown for USC. Jordan Bishop caught a 5-yard pass from Ryan Katz to increase the Beavers' lead to 22 in the fourth quarter. Then an 8-yard touchdown pass from Katz to Joe Halahuni sealed the game for the Beavers. The Trojans have lost the last three games in Corvallis.  Oregon State's 36–7 victory marked their biggest win over USC in 96 years.

Stanford

Oregon

Rankings

Statistics

Team

Scores by quarter

References

Oregon State
Oregon State Beavers football seasons
Oregon State Beavers football